USCS Vanderbilt was a schooner that served as a survey ship in the United States Coast Survey from 1842 to 1855.

Vanderbilt was built in 1842 and entered service with the Coast Survey that year. She spent her career along the United States East Coast.

Vanderbilt was retired in 1855.

References
NOAA History, A Science Odyssey: Tools of the Trade: Ships: Coast and Geodetic Survey Ships: Vanderbilt

Ships of the United States Coast Survey
Schooners of the United States
1842 ships
Ships built in Baltimore